K-1 World Grand Prix 2005 in Tokyo Final was a kickboxing event promoted by the K-1. The event was held at the Tokyo Dome in Tokyo, Japan on Saturday, November 19, 2005 in front of 58,213 spectators. It was the thirteenth K-1 World Grand Prix final, involving twelve of the world's best K-1 fighters (four being reservists), with all bouts fought under K-1 Rules (100 kg/156-220 lbs). The tournament qualifiers had almost all qualified via the K-1 World Grand Prix 2005 in Osaka - Final Elimination with the exception of Remy Bonjasky who was the reigning champion.  As well as tournament matches there was also an 'Opening Fight' fought under K-1 Rules between Patrick Barry and Alexander Pitchkounov.  In total there were fourteen fighters at the event, representing eleven countries.

The tournament winner was Semmy Schilt who defeated Glaube Feitosa in the final by first round knockout.  The event was Semmy Schilt and Glaube Feitosa's first K-1 World Grand Prix final appearance and would be the first of Semmy Schilt's three consecutive K-1 World Grand Prix final victories - a K-1 record.  Semmy Schilt would also be the first karate practitioner to win the K-1 World Grand Prix since Andy Hug in 1996.

K-1 World Grand Prix 2005 Tournament

* Glaube Feitosa replaced Peter Aerts in the Semi Finals as Peter Aerts was injured

Results 

Opening Fight: K-1 Rules / 3Min. 3R
Aleksandr Pitchkounov  vs Patrick Barry 
Match resulted in a 3rd Round Decision Draw 1-1 (30-27, 29-29, 28-29)

Quarter Finals: K-1 Rules / 3Min. 3R Ext.1R
Remy Bonjasky  vs Choi Hong-man 
Bonjasky defeated Choi by 3rd Round Unanimous Decision 3-0 (30-29, 30-29, 30-28)

Ray Sefo  vs Semmy Schilt  
Schilt defeated Sefo by 3rd Round Unanimous Decision 3-0 (30-26, 30-26, 30-26)

Jérôme Le Banner  vs Peter Aerts 
Aerts defeated Le Banner by Extra Round Unanimous Decision 3-0 (10-9, 10-9, 10-9) but could not continue due to a fractured rib - Reserve Fight winner Glaube Feitosa would take his place in the Semi Finals.  After 3 rounds the judges had scored it a Decision Draw (29-29, 29-29, 29-29)

Musashi  vs Ruslan Karaev  
Musashi defeated Karaev by Extra Round Unanimous Decision 3-0 (10-9, 10-9, 10-9).  After 3 rounds the judges had scored it a Decision Draw (30-29, 30-30, 29-30).

Reserve Fights: K-1 Rules / 3Min. 3R Ext.1R
Glaube Feitosa  vs Gary Goodridge 
Feitosa defeated Goodridge by 3rd Round Unanimous Decision 3-0 (30-27, 30-28, 30-28)

Stefan Leko  vs Badr Hari 
Hari defeated Leko by KO (Spinning Back Left High Kick) at 1:30 of the 2nd Round

Semi Finals: K-1 Rules / 3Min. 3R Ext.1R
Remy Bonjasky  vs Semmy Schilt 
Schilt defeated Bonjasky by KO (Knee Strike) at 2:08 of the 1st Round

Glaube Feitosa  vs Musashi 
Feitosa defeated Musashi by KO (Flying Knee) at 1:05 of the 2nd Round

Final: K-1 Rules / 3Min. 3R Ext.2R
Semmy Schilt  vs Glaube Feitosa 
Schilt defeated Feitosa by KO (Knee Strike) at 0:48 of the 1st Round

See also
List of K-1 events
List of K-1 champions
List of male kickboxers

References

External links
K-1sport.de - Your Source for Everything K-1
K-1 Official Website

K-1 events
2005 in kickboxing
Kickboxing in Japan
Sports competitions in Tokyo